Sinead O'Connor (also Shelby and Roscoe) is a fictional character from the British Channel 4 soap opera, Hollyoaks, played by Stephanie Davis. The character first appeared on-screen during the episode broadcast 1 September 2010. Sinead is a member of the O'Connor family, who were introduced as part of a cast turnover. Producers devised a "Romeo and Juliet" pairing for Sinead and Bart McQueen (Jonny Clarke).

Davis was fired from the show in July 2015 after poor behaviour on-set and Sinead departed during the episode broadcast on 18 September 2015. Davis' reintroduction was announced in May 2018, and the character returned on 23 October that year.  In November 2019, Davis announced that she had decided to take a break from the show, having made her last appearance on 18 September of the same year. Nine months later, Davis announced on 15 June 2020 that she had opted to not return to the show following the break.

Creation and casting
In 2010, Davis appeared as a contestant on BBC talent contest Over the Rainbow. When she departed the competition Hollyoaks contacted her agent requesting that she audition for the show. Davis gave up her pursuit of stage work to star as Sinead. She later told Dawn Collinson from the Liverpool Echo that "I definitely, 100% made the right decision, it’s Hollyoaks all the way". Sinead was created during producer Paul Marquess's "radical makeover" of Hollyoaks. Marquess first mentioned the family during a May 2010 interview with Kris Green from Digital Spy. He revealed that "something shocking happens to them really early on".

Davis' casting was publicised in June 2010, alongside the announcement of the O'Connor family. Green reported that Davis was joined by Gary Cargill and Alex Fletcher playing Sinead's father Rob and stepmother Diane O'Connor respectively, while the role of sibling Finn O'Connor had been given to Connor Wilkinson. Green added that the family would be under threat from Diane's desire to conceive a child via IVF. Marquess was excited about the family because they would bring a "dramatic storyline" to the show.

Development
In July 2012, Hollyoaks teamed up with L'Oréal Paris to promote their "Feria hair colour" brand and in exchange give Sinead a make-over. The cosmetic company announced the news via their website stating that they had transformed Sinéad's hair "from glossy brunette into fiery red". The character was shown wanting a new look prior to a trip to Abersoch to "give herself an extra boost of confidence". Hollyoaks also released a video to profile Davis having the treatment applied to her hair.

Davis later told a reporter from K9 magazine that she liked Sinéad's "feisty nature" but felt she became quieter in 2012.

Sinead begins a romance with Bart McQueen (Jonny Clarke) but Diane does not approve. They decide that the only solution to be together is running away. Davis told Collinson that Diane does not want Bart in Sinead's life so they go to Wales. To begin with they find excitement in staying in a bed and breakfast but "then obviously as time goes on it gets a lot harder". As the money runs out they start struggling. She stated that the only good thing for Bart and Sinead is that they have each other, forming a "Romeo and Juliet" pairing. They take jobs at a fairground but they find themselves in a predicament as they "bicker" but ultimately reconcile due to love. Diane tracks them down and attempts to convince Sinead to return home. Davis explained that the duo have "got no money, they’re hungry, Sinead just wants a bath and to see her friends. It's a cliffhanger whether she goes home and has all those luxuries and doesn’t get to be with Bart, or she stays with nothing."

Davis sympathised with her character because she understood the feeling of wanting to be with someone who may not be suitable. Off-screen she had formed a good rapport with Clarke, claimed to know him "inside out" and therefore did not find their kissing scenes weird to film. She added that extras working on the show believe their on-screen chemistry so much that they suggested they should be together in reality.

Departure
On 16 July 2015, it was reported by Digital Spy that Stephanie Davis would not be filming any further scenes in her role as Sinead after show bosses decided to terminate her contract. A Hollyoaks spokesperson told Digital Spy: "Stephanie Davis will no longer be filming Hollyoaks. Her contract has been terminated with immediate effect. "Stephanie's contract was terminated following warnings for lateness, attendance and after a final incident in which she turned up to set unfit to work because of alcohol consumption". Her final scenes aired on 18 September 2015.

Reintroduction 
On 21 May 2018, it was announced that Davis would reprise her role as Sinead. The character will return in scenes broadcast in October. Davis was excited to return to the soap and looked forward to returning to the process of being in the show. Executive producer Bryan Kirkwood expressed his delight at Davis' return and called Sinead "a brilliant and vibrant character who the audience love". Justin Harp from Digital Spy called Davis' return "perhaps the most surprising soap casting of the year thus far".

Storylines

2010–2015
Sinead befriends Amber Sharpe (Lydia Lloyd-Henry) and her father, Rob, is promoted to headmaster when they accidentally knock Mr. Forsyth unconscious. Sinead's stepmother, Diane, asks Sinead to inject her with her IVF drugs and it begins to affect their relationship. Finn tells Sinead that he is worried Diane may forget about her step-children if she has a child of her own. Diane takes a pregnancy test which is negative but finds an abandoned baby at the hospital and brings him home. She tells Sinead she wants to keep him but is forced to ask Lynsey Nolan (Karen Hassan) for medical advice when he falls ill. Lynsey threatens to contact the authorities, but Anita Roy (Saira Choudhry) tells Lynsey to back off. Sinead develops an attraction to Taylor Sharpe (Shaun Blackstock) and despite distraction from Taylor's brother Arlo Davenport (Travis Yates) they begin dating. Sinead reads Amber's diary and she claims that Rob has fathered the baby she is carrying. Sinead and Diane later uncover that Finn is the father of Amber's baby and she ends her relationship with Taylor. Rob's disgruntled ex-employee, Eva Strong (Sheree Murphy), steals Amber's diary and Sinead convinces Rob to reinstate Eva in exchange for the diary. Eva, however, keeps pages and with the evidence, imprisons Rob. It is later revealed that Rob's relationship with Diane started when she was his pupil and Sinead's mother is still alive. Sinead and Ruby Button (Anna Shaffer) begin teasing Esther Bloom (Jazmine Franks) when Esther pretends that Sinead is her girlfriend.

Sinead moves on to Bart McQueen (Jonny Clarke) and he convinces her to contact her mother. She meets Morag Fairhurst (Lisa Coleman) who reveals that she walked out on her family because of stress. She reveals that Sinead had leukaemia and Finn was a planned child to serve as a saviour sibling. Sinead accepts Morag's offer to move to New York but changes her mind when she realises Morag does not want to see Finn. Sinead finally seals the deal with Bart and Diane disapproves as she believes that he will distract her from her education. Sinead travels to Abersoch with her friends and is jealous of Bart's ex-girlfriend Maddie Morrison (Scarlett Bowman). Sinead almost drowns in the sea after getting drunk. Upon hearing of Sinead's near-death experience, she attempts to end Sinead's involvement with Bart. Tired of Diane's interference, the pair prepare to leave Hollyoaks. Their new life starts by seeking somewhere to live and jobs at fairgrounds and caravan parks but ultimately they sleep on the streets. In need of cash, Bart contacts Jason Costello (Victoria Atkin), his transgender ex, angering Sinead because of Bart's relationship with Jason before he identified himself as transgender. Sinead's jealousy grows, leaving them to face an armed farmer, who owns the house they were stealing from. Sinead saves Bart and Jason despite learning that they kissed but later attacks Jason and mocks his transgender status.

She returns to Hollyoaks and dumps Bart. Sinead starts college and forms a tenuous friendship with Maddie, who joins her and Ruby in bullying Esther. When Maddie realises that Sinead and Bart are growing close again, she convinces her to date Gaz Bennett (Joel Goonan) instead. Maddie encourages her to consummate her relationship with Gaz and convinces Bart to plant stolen goods on Gaz, but Sinead is arrested. Maddie attempts to tell Sinead about Gaz's unexpected move on her, but Sinead refuses to believe her. While Gaz is about to leave Sinead, he and Sinead learn that they have jobs, selling concert merchandise in London, but only as a couple. At a Wretch 32 concert, Bart comes on stage and sings a song for Sinead. This convinces her to get back with him and Gaz leaves. Bart is caught growing cannabis in his attic and he decides to run away. Sinead tries to leave with him but the charges are dropped. She eventually tires of his cannabis habit and threatens to leave him. When Bart refuses to stop smoking cannabis, she ends their relationship. She attends a party and has a one-night stand with a mystery man but later reunites with Bart. Sinead joins her friends in a stolen van driving Ruby and Jono to their wedding. Bart and Esther chase the van to stop the wedding, but the van's brakes fail and they crash into a separate wedding venue. Martin "Jono" Johnson (Dylan Llewellyn) saves Ruby but Maddie and Neil Cooper (Tosin Cole) die in the explosion.

After being hospitalised, Sinead learns she is pregnant. She steals a photograph of Rhys Ashworth (Andrew Moss) who also died in the crash, giving the impression he is the father of her baby. Shortly after the crash, Jono dies in Ruby's arms from a blood clot. Sinead and Bart decide to raise the baby together, and join Ruby in pressuring Esther to keep her and Bart's involvement in the crash secret. Sinead and Ruby's mistreatment of Esther escalates to the point that Esther attempts suicide which leads her to require a liver transplant. Sinead and Ruby make a pact to keep quiet about their bullying. However, Ruby feels guilty and admits her involvement to Esther's family. Meanwhile, Diane asks Sinead if she was involved but she denies everything. Diane, however, checks Sinead's laptop and smashes it when she finds the images Sinead posted. Diane convinces Sinead to blame it all on Ruby but Ruby reveals everything at a gathering. The morning after the event, the headmaster Patrick Blake (Jeremy Sheffield) calls Sinead into his office. Sinead shows no remorse and is promptly expelled. She gets a job at Price Slice and after falling off a ladder, learns that she is having a girl. Sinead decides she no longer wants to keep her baby and plans to get rid of it but after talking to Cindy, she decides to give the baby to Diane who initially refuses to raise the baby but later changes her mind.

While working at Price Slice she is held at gunpoint by Robbie Roscoe (Charlie Wernham) and her brother Finn, although they are wearing masks. Just in time Callum walks into the shop and attacks Robbie who accidentally shoots him. An ambulance is called and Sinead finds out her baby is okay. She is horrified when she learns her brother Finn was involved and slaps him, but she goes into labour. She gives birth in the back of a burnt out car with help from Esther. She is taken to hospital where the baby is checked to see if she is alright. Diane names the baby Katy and takes her home. Sinead decides she can't watch Diane raise her baby and moves in with Ste. She returns to working at Price Slice but soon decides to quit. After an argument with Mercedes McQueen (Jennifer Metcalfe) she accepts a job working for her at Chez Chez. Ste gets her into drug dealing, however, as Sinead is struggling for money and she starts dealing at Chez Chez. When she gives a man the wrong drugs, he angrily attacks her. Soon she gets arrested for drug dealing but is released as it's a first offence. Diane finds out about her drug dealing and makes Sinead move back in with her. She only stays for a few days before she decides to move out, taking Katy with her. She is also fired from Chez Chez. She falls out with Holly and Cindy, and Myra McQueen (Nicole Barber-Lane), when Myra finds out Bart is not the father of Sinead's baby.

Desperate for money, Sinead begins working as a prostitute. She falls in love with police officer, DS Trent. However, Trent is murdered by Trevor Royle (Greg Wood) who he had been investigating. A heartbroken Sinead resumes working as a prostitute, with Trevor as her pimp. She steals a bag from Trevor, believing it to be full of cash and gives it to Ste and Doug as a leaving present. During their leaving party, Sinead goes to open the bag and discovers it is a bomb, set up by Clare to kill the McQueens. She screams for Ste, but the bomb goes off. Doug helps Sinead out and goes back in to get Ste before succumbing to his injuries.

Sinead soon starts a relationship with Freddie Roscoe (Charlie Clapham) but they fall out when she realises that he loves Lindsey Butterfield (Sophie Austin), who is engaged to his brother Joe (Ayden Callaghan). On Christmas Day when Sinead sees Freddie and Lindsey hugging, she gets the wrong end idea and thinks that Freddie is cheating on her. For revenge she writes a Christmas card to Joe telling him about Freddie being in love with Lindsey. She sends it but Robbie finds it before Joe reads it, he then blackmails Sinead into sleeping with him, but he backs down when he realises that she doesn't want to. Freddie then proposes and she says yes. Lindsey doesn't approve of Freddie marrying Sinead and when Sinead sees them hugging again she gets the wrong idea again and sleeps with Robbie. When Freddie finds out, he attacks Robbie and falls out with Sinead. However the pair make up and they marry. Sinead is worried when baby Katy falls ill and takes her to the hospital. Lindsey accuses Sinead of lying about Katy being ill for attention and misdiagnoses her, discharging the infant from the hospital. Infuriated, Sinead puts blood in Katy's nappy which had come from a cut on Sinead's finger to ensure that she is diagnosed properly by a doctor, but later admits the truth to Diane. Social services takes Katy away from Sinead and Diane becomes her foster mom. However, when Diane is arrested for possession of drugs during her wedding to Tony Hutchinson (Nick Pickard), Sinead is allowed by Finn to see Katy whilst he is out of the room. Shortly after Sinead leaves, Diane returns and discovers Katy convulsing in her cot. Katy is rushed to hospital whilst Sinead is arrested for assaulting Diane, and Freddie informs Sinead that Katy is in intensive care.

Sinead steals a car after being cautioned at the police station to get to the hospital, but Fraser Black (Jesse Birdsall) crashes into Sinead and leaves her trapped inside her car. Luckily, Sinead is found and is taken to the hospital, but Freddie informs her that Katy has died. Sinead is put on a psychiatric ward as Finn confesses that Sinead was alone with Katy before she was rushed to hospital and everybody, including Diane, believes Sinead poisoned Katy in a bid for attention however it is revealed at Katy's funeral that Katy really was ill and Sinead had nothing to do with her death. Sinead leaves Freddie because he didn't believe that she didn't hurt Katy. In May, she finds out about Sonny Valentine's (Aaron Fontaine) part in the death of Superintendent Marlow (Paul Clayton). She threatens to tell the police unless Sonny helps her get back at Lindsey. After injuring herself, she goes to the hospital with Sonny where she is treated by Lindsey. Lindsey tries to sympathise with Sinead while treating her, but only causes her to get angrier. Sinead slaps Lindsey, then pushes her over, causing a syringe to enter her. Sinead then announces she is HIV positive. Believing her claims, Carmel Valentine (Gemma Merna) organises an AIDS charity event during which Joe arrives and reveals Sinead has been lying to make Lindsey suffer. Sinead decides that she needs to punish Lindsey and make her pay for "killing her baby". Sinead steals a car from Freddie's work and kidnaps Lindsey, handcuffing her to the door. She drives to a canal and threatens to drive into it unless Lindsey and Freddie, who is in the car, admit they had an affair. Lindsey, scared for her life, admits that she loved Freddie because she was lonely and briefly wanted them to run away together and bring up a baby. Sinead unties her and lets her go, then reveals to them that she had a phone which she phoned Joe on, and he overheard everything.

Sinead starts an affair with her stepfather Tony to punish Diane for believing she could hurt Katy, although she soon develops real feelings for him. When they decide to go for a weekend away together Diane becomes suspicious and tracks Tony down. She discovers his affair when she finds another woman's underwear in his washing and a hotel employees tells her that Tony was with a younger woman. Diane does not find out that it was Sinead. Sinead drunkenly sleeps with Ste, and a few weeks later discovers she's pregnant, but believes it is with Tony's child. Diane and Tony plan to marry again, but on the hen night, Diane discovers Sinead is pregnant and confronts her about the father. Sinead lies and informs her it was a fling with Darryl (Rhys Howells), but when Diane invites Darryl to the wedding so Sinead can inform him about her baby, he tells Diane him and Sinead never slept together. Diane realises Sinead and Tony's deceit and publicly embarrasses them, throwing them out.

After reading Tony's mail, Sinead discovers that his cancer treatment left him infertile and realises that Ste is the father of her baby which doesn't take Esther long to realise. Tony confronts Sinead in front of Holly, Tom Cunningham (Ellis Hollins), Cindy Cunningham (Stephanie Waring), Dirk Savage (David Kennedy) and Darren Osborne (Ashley Taylor Dawson). Sinead then tries to get Tony to forgive her which he doesn't and kicks her out. Sinead then tells Ste on his wedding day that he is the father of her baby. Ste then locks Sinead in a room to shut her up. That night, Sinead confronts Ste in front of everyone before running out of The Hutch and getting hit by Dodger Savage's (Danny Mac) car during a scuffle with his twin sister Sienna Blake (Anna Passey), which knocks her to the floor. She needs an operation but refuses to give consent as it means her baby's life would be put in danger despite the fact that if she doesn't have it she will die. Diane and Ste however change her mind and both she and the baby survive. Diane forgives Sinead for sleeping with Tony and lets her move back in. Ste promises to support her and the baby and she soon develops feelings for him.

In April 2015, Sinead's divorce from Freddie comes through leaving him free to marry Lindsey. Her step-cousin, Scott Drinkwell (Ross Adams) arrives in Hollyoaks and helps her try to get Ste by meddling with his marriage to John Paul. She tries to use Harry to get together with John Paul but her plan fails and causes Ste to get attacked. When Sinead finds out that Harry was there she calls the police. She is shocked however when Harry under pressure from the real attackers and not wanting his sexuality to come out says he did it. She, John Paul, Ste and Scott all agree to keep quiet about Harry's sexuality until he feels he's ready to come out. On Freddie and Lindsey's wedding day Sinead becomes hysterical looking at her old wedding photos so Scott suggests gatecrashing the wedding which she agrees to do. However, due to a fight between Freddie and Joe, Sinead is knocked to the floor and her water breaks. However the baby takes a long time to arrive and Sinead worries the baby will be born on Katy's birthday. However, the Sinead gives birth the day after with Ste at her side. They name the baby girl Hannah.

After Hannah's birth Sinead accidentally reveals to Ste that she's in love with him but when he rejects her she makes a cruel comment about his HIV causing him to have a relapse. However Ste cleans up his act and agrees to give things a try between them for Hannah's sake. Sinead later goes off on a spa day with Esther but due to the work of Grace Black (Tamara Wall), Dylan Jenkins (James Fletcher), Nico Blake (Persephone Swales-Dawson) and Kim Butterfield (Daisy Wood-Davis) they are stranded in the middle of nowhere without their mobile phones while Esther is in labour. Sinead then helps Esther give birth to Curtis. When Scott returns, Sinead becomes paranoid about him flirting with Ste so locks Harry and Ste mistaking him for Scott in a port-a-potty so Scott will leave Ste alone, unaware Harry is in love with Ste and tries to kiss him. Sinead then orders Scott out after he lied about having HIV and cost them the vicar and church for Hannah's christening. Scott however gets her to forgive him by convincing the vicar to do the christening.

Ste later proposes to Sinead and she accepts unaware that he kissed Harry twice. When at Hollyoaks High while helping Ste and Tony with a catering job, Sinead almost walks in on Ste and Harry kissing but they manage to avoid her. Sinead then reads a message that Harry sent Ste and lets Ste see men on the side in the hope he will still stick with her. However, Sinead retracts her message of Ste allowing to sleep with men due to them being two weeks into their engagement. Whilst getting ready on a night in with Ste, Sinead discovers an open packet of condoms in a bin used by Ste and Harry. Sinead later reads a text message Harry sent to Ste and discovers Ste slept with Harry. Angered, Sinead downs a glass of wine and storms out of the flat. Ste later discovers that Sinead has left the village and has taken Hannah with her.

2018–2019

In October 2018, Sinead returns when she is on the phone to Diane and is furious to discover that it is Ste and Harry's wedding day. Sinead returns to Hollyoaks during the storm to ruin the wedding. Her car breaks down and she gets picked up by Sami Maalik (Rishi Nair). They argue but when Sami's car breaks down they have sex. They get locked out of the car and are horrified when they see a tornado heading their way. Fortunately, they get back into the car just in time. The next day, Sinead surprises Diane and Tony at their flat and they tell her that Ste and Harry split up. Sinead confronts Ste and slaps him, unaware that his sister Tegan Lomax (Jessica Ellis) died in the storm. Ste demands to see Hannah and Sinead eventually agrees. She asks Sami to help her pick up Hannah from daycare. While Sami waits in the car, a panicked Sinead gets it with Hannah and tells Sami to drive. She laters thanks Sami and they have sex in the back of his car. Sinead is pulled off by a man who Sami attacks and she reveals him to be her husband, Laurie Shelby (Kyle Pryor). Sinead confronts Laurie over an affair that he had but he reveals that Sinead attacked the teaching assistant. They decide to give their marriage another chance and Sinead is delighted when she lands a job as a nurse. Prostitute Donna-Marie Quinn (Lucy-Jo Hudson) recognises Sinead but Sinead pretends not to know her. Donna Marie later blackmails Sinead and Sinead plants drugs in her bag during the nativity. When Donna Marie notices this, she exposes Sinead as a former prostitute, causing Laurie to run off. Laurie refuses to forgive Sinead and she decides to end their marriage but Laurie convinces her to give the marriage another go.

Sinead becomes jealous over Laurie and Sienna, especially when Nancy reminds her how Sienna stole her husband and Sinead desperately tries to drive a wedge between them. She is convinced that they are sleeping together and Sinead publicly humiliates Sienna at the ball by pouring punch over her. Laurie turns the tables on Sinead and makes her feel guilty for causing a scene. They make up with a kiss, however, Sinead is left with bruises on her arm. Laurie is furious when he learns of Sineads affair with Tony years previously. In April 2019, Sinead becomes even more jealous when Laurie and Sienna are going on a camping trip together. She confronts them in the village but Laurie informs her that he hasn't told Sienna. That night, Sinead tries to contact Laurie multiple times but he doesn't answer. Sami comforts Sinead and they kiss which is witnessed by Tony. Ste discovers this and uses it to ruin Sami's proposal to Liberty Savage (Jessamy Stoddart). Laurie and Sinead have a heated argument and Laurie leads her to their bedroom where he closes the door. The next morning it becomes clear that Laurie raped Sinead. Laurie pretends that nothing happened and Liberty confronts Sinead over Sami. Laurie promises that he will never touch her again. Sienna tells Sinead that Laurie ripped up her tent and Sinead calls her a 'bitch’. Laurie and Sinead have another argument and Laurie makes her believe that he didn't rape her. Sinead continues to feel uncomfortable around Laurie. When Sineads cousin Lily McQueen (Lauren McQueen) runs away from hospital, Sinead finds her hiding from Diane. She agrees to go and get Lily's bag from the flat. However, Lily dies from sepsis and Sinead blames herself. Sinead makes up excuses to Laurie for not being able to return to their bed by telling him that Hannah has been wetting hers. Laurie finds out that she is lying and Sinead tells him that she gets scared when he is angry and he tells her that she will be the cause of their marriage breakdown. Sinead confides in Cleo McQueen (Nadine Mulkerrin) that she is scared of her husband and Cleo tries to make her see that Laurie is abusing her. Sinead is horrified when she finds out that Laurie paid off a woman who accused him of sexual assault. Sinead confronts him over this and he admits to harassing Sienna but he turns it around on her by bringing up her kissing Sami. Laurie returns home and tells Sinead that Sienna's boyfriend Brody Hudson (Adam Woodward) kidnapped him. Sinead tells him to call the police but Laurie gets angry and corners her and starts to shout when she refuses to kiss her. However, Hannah knocks on the door and Laurie stops shouting. The next day, Sinead tells Laurie that Misbah Maalik (Harvey Virdi) has selected her for a training residential course, meaning that she will be gone for a few weeks. Laurie finds out from Misbah that there is no training course and realises that Sinead is leaving him. He stops her just in time and convinces Sinead not to leave him.

Laurie decides to take anger management classes to prove to Sinead that he has changed. However, Sinead finds out that he hasn't been going to his classes but then believes him after he tells her the name of the person doing the classes. Sinead supports Laurie during the school board meeting and Laurie is aloud return to work. Sienna goes to the hospital to see Sinead, who lets it slip that Laurie is taking anger management classes and Sienna discovers that Laurie is hurting Sinead. Sienna confronts him over this and tries to kill him. Sinead discovers that the name of the women doing the sessions is an author and that Laurie lied to her. When he returns home, she confronts him over this but he ignores her and turns up the music and rapes her. Laurie leaves the room and Sinead struggles to get out of bed. She goes into the kitchen and when she sees Laurie touching Hannah's arm she shouts at him in front of Diane and Tony. Laurie tries to cover Sineads outburst, but she tearfully reveals to Diane and Tony that Laurie raped her. He tries to convince them that she is lying but apologises to Sinead for getting carried away. At the police station, Sinead goes over the night again, however, she remembers that she posted a picture of her and Laurie shortly after he raped her so she lies saying it was the night before on 1 April. When she returns home she checks her diary and is horrified when she realises that Laurie was on the camping trip that night and that he has an alibi. Sinead begs Sienna to lie to the police. She pleads with Sami to help her and he tells her to say she got confused. Sinead tells the police that it happened on 2 April and that she lied because she didn't think they would believe her. DC Jones tells her that because of her lie, her statement is unreliable and the case is dropped and Laurie is released. Sienna arrives at the flat and Sinead tells her that they have each other and that they stood up to Laurie and they hug. Sinead runs into Laurie at Price Slice and he accuses her of making up the accusations and she threatens to kill him before throwing a bottle of wine at him. DC Jones asks Sinead to accompany her to the station. She refuses so DC Jones arrests her for perverting the course of justice while a smug Laurie looks on.

Sinead is refused bail and is locked up. In June, Sami tries to convince her to plead guilty but she ignores his advice. Diane tries to make her plead guilty by bringing Hannah to visit her. Sinead confides in Diane that she doesn't think she will be able to beat Laurie. Sinead breaksdown and trashes her cell and she tells Sami that she isn't going to court. However, she changes her mind when Sami brings Laurie's past victim Georgia to visit her. Sinead is released on bail but is furious to learn from Liberty that Sami got Georgia to sign a non-disclosure agreement and storms off. Laurie approaches Georgia and scares her off and Sinead breaks down in front of Diane who promises to get back at Laurie.

Diane confronts Laurie at the prom in front of the guests. He follows her into the bathroom and tries to rape her. Sinead and Sienna arrive at the school and hear Diane's screams. Diane runs onto the balcony and is followed by Laurie who is followed by Sinead and Sienna. Sinead pulls Laurie off Diane but he pushes her onto Sienna. Sinead eventually pushes Laurie, causing him to fall off the balcony. Sinead rushes to his aid but Sienna and Diane try to convince her to leave him to die. The police arrive and Sinead admits to pushing him and she is arrested. She is refused bail but when she is being taken to her cell, Sally St. Claire (Annie Wallace) and Liberty arrive with CCTV from the school proving that Laurie tried to rape Diane. Laurie survives the fall and is charged for attempted rape. Laurie later escapes from prison and kidnaps Sinead. However, Sinead fights back and escapes after Laurie lost control of the car and crash. Laurie collapses and dies at the scene, devastating Sinead. Sinead began a relationship with Sami. When Finn is released from prison and moves back into Diane's, Sinead refuse to forgive him and moves in with Sami and his family. Sinead stood up for Sami and his family when Ste, Jonny Baxter and Sid Sumner targets at the Maaliks. Sami proposes and Sinead and they became engaged. Sinead bans Ste from seeing Hannah, and announce her engagement to him. 

Sinead tries to keep her engagement and wedding from Finn, not wanting him to be involved, and clashes with Diane. Sami's brother Azim Desai arrives to the village and organised Sami and Sinead's engagement party. During the engagement party, Sami's sister, Yasmine Maalik (Haiesha Mistry) gets involve of an explosion at the Maalik's house, losing her hearing. Sinead, Sami and Hannah goes to Spain, while Sami's remaining family stay with Leela and Peri. A few days later, Sami returns to the village alone, and he admits to Azim that he and Sinead had a fall out in Spain. On the day of their wedding, Sinead texts Sami that she can't marry him and is staying in Spain.

Reception
For her portrayal of Sinead, Davis received a "Serial Drama Performance" nomination at the 2012 National Television Awards. She was also nominated for the "Sexiest Female" award in the British Soap Awards but lost out to Michelle Keegan of Coronation Street. In 2014, Davis was nominated for the "Best Actress" award and "Best Dramatic Performance" at The British Soap Awards for her portrayal of Sinead.

Justin Harp of Digital Spy called the news of Sinead's reintroduction "the most surprising soap casting of the year".

References

External links
 Character profile at E4.com
 Character profile at Holy Soap

Hollyoaks characters
Fictional people from Liverpool
Television characters introduced in 2010
Fictional prostitutes
Fictional teenage parents
Fictional bullies
Female villains
Fictional characters with cancer
Fictional shopkeepers
Fictional bartenders
Fictional victims of sexual assault
Fictional waiting staff
Female characters in television
Fictional nurses